The Rajya Sabha (meaning the "Council of States") is the upper house of the Parliament of India. Bihar state elects 16 members since 2002 biennial elections. Earlier, Bihar State elected 21 seats since April 1952 and 22 seats since 1956 and 16 members after the Bihar Reorganisation Act 2000 and creation of new Jharkhand state on 15 November 2000. They are indirectly elected by the State Legislators of Bihar State. Members are elected for six years and 1/3 of members are retired after every two years. The number of seats, allocated to the party, are determined by the number of seats a party possesses during nomination and the party nominates a member to be voted on. Elections within the state legislatures are held using Single transferable vote with proportional representation.

Members from Bihar are listed in the list of current members of the Rajya Sabha.

Current members (2022)
Keys:

Alphabetical list of all members from Bihar
This is the term wise list of former Rajya Sabha members from Bihar, arranged alphabetically by Last name of the member.Source: Parliament of India (Rajya Sabha)

The list is incomplete.

Keys:

References

External links
Rajya Sabha homepage hosted by the Indian government
Rajya Sabha FAQ page hosted by the Indian government
Who's who list
State wise list

Bihar
 
Bihar-related lists